James Edward Smith may refer to:
 James Edward Smith (botanist), English botanist and founder of the Linnean Society
 James Edward Smith (murderer), American murderer
 James Edward Smith (politician), Canadian businessman and mayor of Toronto
 James E. Smith (biblical scholar), American biblical scholar
 James Smith (New South Wales politician), member of the New South Wales Legislative Assembly

See also
 James Smith (disambiguation)